Ben “Big Boy” McEvoy (born 11 July 1989) is a former professional Australian rules footballer who played for the St Kilda Football Club and Hawthorn Football Club in the Australian Football League (AFL).

Early career
McEvoy is an Australian Institute of Sport and AFL Academy graduate. He was an All-Australian selection in the NAB AFL Under 18 championships, averaging seven marks per game as a ruck/forward. He played junior football with Dederang-Mt Beauty and U18 football with the Murray Bushrangers in the TAC Cup. In 2007 he captained the Murray Bushrangers and won the best and fairest award.

AFL career

St Kilda

With an injury to Michael Gardiner he made his debut for St Kilda against Fremantle in 2008. This was his only game for that year and he has been in and out of the St Kilda senior side for the next two years, wearing the number 5 jumper. In that time he was consistently in the best players for St Kilda's VFL affiliate team, Casey Scorpions.

2010 season
Hawthorn and St Kilda played out a draw in Round 17 after McEvoy kicked a goal with 12 seconds remaining. McEvoy went up uncontested in a ball-up and then dribbled through the goal from 12m out with no Hawthorn player in the goalsquare. After playing strongly into and through the 2010 finals series, including eight consecutive games and 18 for the season, McEvoy was dropped for the Grand Final. With injury to first ruck Michael Gardiner, McEvoy regained his place in the side for the grand final replay in which St Kilda were defeated by Collingwood.

2011 season
The 2011 season was widely considered McEvoy's breakout season. After a strong preseason, McEvoy's fitness and preparation was lauded as outstanding by those close to the club. He worked closely with Steven King before and during the season to improve his technical skill to assume the lead ruck role for the club.

2012 season
He was St Kilda's number one ruckman again in 2012, but had mid season surgery to his knee after he injured it at training. He missed six games and after returning played every game to season's end. He liked to spend time dropping back into defence to take strong contested marks.

2013 season
McEvoy played all 22 games for St Kilda in season 2013 and held down the number one ruck role.

Hawthorn
During the 2013 trade period, McEvoy was traded by St Kilda to Hawthorn in exchange for young midfielder Shane Savage and Hawthorn's first round pick. The Saints had decided to rebuild their playing list by trading players for early draft picks. McEvoy was holidaying in Cambodia when he was contacted to agree to the trade. The Hawks were hopeful at the time that McEvoy could hold down the number one ruck position after premiership ruckman Max Bailey announced his retirement post-season.

After being in and out of the side during the 2014 season, McEvoy featured in the Hawthorn side which defeated  by 63 points to win the club's 12th premiership. He also featured in the 2015 Hawthorn Premiership side where the Hawks defeated the West Coast Eagles to claim their third straight premiership.

On 14 August 2017 McEvoy signed a two-year contract extension keeping him at Hawthorn until the end of 2019.

Following a player vote, McEvoy was named Hawthorn's 37th VFL/AFL captain for the 2021 season replacing Ben Stratton who retired following the 2020 season. McEvoy was the first player since Keith Shea in 1945 to become Hawthorn captain after playing for another club. McEvoy also became the first ruckman to captain Hawthorn since Don Scott in 1980.

Statistics

|-
| 2008 ||  || 5
| 1 || 0 || 1 || 5 || 1 || 6 || 4 || 1 || 0 || 0.0 || 1.0 || 5.0 || 1.0 || 6.0 || 4.0 || 1.0 || 0.0 || 0
|-
| 2009 ||  || 5
| 11 || 3 || 2 || 32 || 49 || 81 || 30 || 20 || 94 || 0.3 || 0.2 || 2.9 || 4.5 || 7.4 || 2.7 || 1.8 || 8.5 || 0
|-
| 2010 ||  || 5
| 19 || 7 || 4 || 71 || 128 || 199 || 75 || 50 || 205 || 0.4 || 0.2 || 3.7 || 6.7 || 10.5 || 3.9 || 2.6 || 10.8 || 0
|-
| 2011 ||  || 5
| 22 || 4 || 5 || 121 || 199 || 320 || 118 || 85 || 497 || 0.2 || 0.2 || 5.5 || 9.0 || 14.5 || 5.4 || 3.9 || 22.6 || 1
|-
| 2012 ||  || 5
| 16 || 7 || 0 || 95 || 101 || 196 || 85 || 60 || 405 || 0.4 || 0.0 || 5.9 || 6.3 || 12.3 || 5.3 || 3.8 || 25.3 || 0
|-
| 2013 ||  || 5
| 22 || 6 || 2 || 116 || 137 || 253 || 103 || 63 || 449 || 0.3 || 0.1 || 5.3 || 6.2 || 11.5 || 4.7 || 2.9 || 20.4 || 1
|-
| bgcolor=F0E68C | 2014# ||  || 7
| 13 || 6 || 2 || 55 || 112 || 167 || 57 || 34 || 271 || 0.5 || 0.2 || 4.2 || 8.6 || 12.8 || 4.4 || 2.6 || 20.8 || 0
|-
| bgcolor=F0E68C | 2015# ||  || 7
| 19 || 12 || 1 || 83 || 127 || 210 || 80 || 62 || 371 || 0.6 || 0.1 || 4.4 || 6.7 || 11.1 || 4.2 || 3.3 || 19.5 || 0
|-
| 2016 ||  || 7
| 23 || 11 || 6 || 86 || 147 || 233 || 79 || 61 || 443 || 0.5 || 0.3 || 3.7 || 6.4 || 10.1 || 3.4 || 2.7 || 19.3 || 0
|-
| 2017 ||  || 7
| 22 || 14 || 1 || 110 || 164 || 274 || 88 || 76 || 712 || 0.6 || 0.0 || 5.0 || 7.5 || 12.5 || 4.0 || 3.5 || 32.4 || 5
|-
| 2018 ||  || 7
| 19 || 6 || 6 || 91 || 144 || 235 || 69 || 61 || 583 || 0.3 || 0.3 || 4.8 || 7.6 || 12.4 || 3.6 || 3.2 || 30.7 || 8
|-
| 2019 ||  || 7
| 19 || 8 || 2 || 101 || 135 || 236 || 91 || 46 || 538 || 0.4 || 0.1 || 5.3 || 7.1 || 12.4 || 4.8 || 2.4 || 28.3 || 4
|-
| 2020 ||  || 7
| 16 || 4 || 1 || 69 || 72 || 141 || 51 || 31 || 161 || 0.3 || 0.1 || 4.3 || 4.5 || 8.8 || 3.2 || 1.9 || 10.1 || 0
|-
| 2021 ||  || 7
| 22 || 12 || 8 || 135 || 140 || 275 || 111 || 78 || 370 || 0.5 || 0.4 || 6.1 || 6.4 || 12.5 || 5.0 || 3.5 || 16.8 || 0
|-
| 2022 ||  || 7
| 8 || 6 || 1 || 36 || 57 || 93 || 17 || 26 || 178 || 0.8 || 0.1 || 4.5 || 7.1 || 11.6 || 2.1 || 3.3 || 22.3 || 0
|- class="sortbottom"
! colspan=3| Career
! 252 !! 106 !! 42 !! 1206 !! 1713 !! 2919 !! 1058 !! 754 !! 5277 !! 0.4 !! 0.2 !! 4.8 !! 6.8 !! 11.6 !! 4.2 !! 3.0 !! 20.9 || 19
|}

Notes

Honours and achievements
Team
 2× AFL premiership player: 2014, 2015
 Minor premiership: 2009
 Minor premiership: 2015

Individual
 Hawthorn captain: 2021–2022
  best clubman: 2021
  life member
 Under 18 All-Australian team: 2007

Personal life
McEvoy has a younger brother Peter, who played for the Box Hill Hawks Football Club development team, and lead the development league in goalkicking in 2014, booting 59 goals. The two brothers played alongside each other in the 2014 elimination final against Port Melbourne, with the brothers combining for 6 goals in a 24-point victory to the Hawks, the same game being Peter's debut VFL match.

References

Further reading

External links

 

1989 births
Living people
Australian rules footballers from Victoria (Australia)
St Kilda Football Club players
Hawthorn Football Club players
Hawthorn Football Club Premiership players
Murray Bushrangers players
Box Hill Football Club players
Casey Demons players
Two-time VFL/AFL Premiership players
AFL Academy graduates